Anna Mykolayivna Kornuta (born 10 November 1988) is a Ukrainian athlete specialising in the long jump. She represented her country at the 2013 World Championships without qualifying for the final.

International competitions

Personal bests
Outdoor
Long jump – 6.72 (+2.0 m/s, Kiev 2013)
Triple jump – 13.70 (+1.9 m/s, Yalta 2011)
Indoor
Long jump – 6.53 (Sumy	2014)
Triple jump – 13.29 (Sumy 2011)

References

0

1988 births
Living people
Ukrainian female long jumpers
Ukrainian female triple jumpers
World Athletics Championships athletes for Ukraine
Olympic athletes of Ukraine
Athletes (track and field) at the 2016 Summer Olympics
21st-century Ukrainian women